Ignacio Pérez Santamaría (born 24 June 1980), known as Nacho, is a Spanish retired footballer who played mainly as a left back (he could also operate as a left midfielder).

He appeared in 220 La Liga games over nine seasons, totalling 13 goals for Málaga (two spells), Levante, Getafe and Betis. He added 124 matches and three goals in Segunda División.

Club career
A product of Málaga CF's youth system, Nacho was born in Málaga, and he made his first-team debut on 23 February 2003 in a 1–1 La Liga home draw against RC Celta de Vigo. He went on to play four seasons with the Andalusians, with a loan to fellow league club Levante UD in between.

In July 2006, upon Málaga's top-division relegation, Nacho signed with Madrid's Getafe CF. Scarcely used during his second season, he would be loaned in January 2008 to Real Sociedad as the Basques ultimately failed to return from Segunda División, with the player appearing in 16 matches – 13 as a starter.

Nacho was loaned again for the 2008–09 campaign, rejoining former side Málaga. Mainly used as a substitute, he scored his first goal in his second spell in a 3–1 away win over Real Valladolid on 22 February 2009, helping them finish eighth immediately after promoting.

On 28 August 2009, Nacho moved to Real Betis of the second tier on a three-year contract. During most of his stint he was used as an attacking left back, and played 34 games in his second year as the Verdiblancos returned to the top division after two years.

Personal life
Nacho's father and uncle, respectively, José Ignacio and Juan Carlos, also played for Málaga. His brother Perico appeared for the club's reserves.

References

External links

Betisweb stats and bio 

1980 births
Living people
Footballers from Málaga
Spanish footballers
Association football defenders
Association football midfielders
Association football utility players
La Liga players
Segunda División players
Segunda División B players
Tercera División players
Atlético Malagueño players
Málaga CF players
Levante UD footballers
Getafe CF footballers
Real Sociedad footballers
Real Betis players